The European Indoor Championships was a men's tennis tournament played in Berlin, Germany. The event was played as part of the ATP Tour in 1990 and 1991. It was played on indoor carpet courts.

Finals

Singles

Doubles

See also
 Berlin Open - Berlin men's tournament (1973–1979)

References
ITF Berlin Open 1990
ITF Berlin Open 1991

ATP Tour
Defunct tennis tournaments in Germany
Carpet court tennis tournaments
Indoor tennis tournaments
Sports competitions in Berlin